This article documents the 1989–90 season of football club Southampton F.C.

League table

Results

First Division

FA Cup

League Cup

Squad

References 

Southampton F.C. seasons
Southampton F.C.